Fanny Hill is a 1964 American – West German historical comedy film directed by Russ Meyer and starring Letícia Román, Miriam Hopkins and Ulli Lommel. Filmed at the Spandau Studios in Berlin, the film is an adaptation of the 1748 John Cleland novel of the same name.

Plot
Young, pretty and innocent Fanny Hill has lost her parents and must find her way in life amidst the perils of turbulent 18th-century London. She is lucky enough to quickly find a place as a waitress for the effusive Mrs. Brown. Mrs. Brown lives in a big house full of women in negligees and with very relaxed manners. She also insists that Fanny meet various gentlemen who show a fervent interest in Fanny.

Cast
 Letícia Román as Fanny Hill
 Miriam Hopkins as Mrs. Brown
 Ulli Lommel as Charles
 Chris Howland as Mr. Norbert
 Helmut Weiss as Mr. Dinklespieler
 Karin Evans as Martha  
 Alexander D'Arcy as Admiral  
 Christiane Schmidtmer as Fiona

Production
Russ Meyer was hired to make the film by Albert Zugsmith, the first time he had directed for a producer who was not himself. According to Roger Ebert, Meyer "found Zugsmith difficult to work with, the German backers of the film unreliable, and the shooting conditions all but impossible."

"The only thing that got me through at all," said Meyer, "was working with Miriam Hopkins, who was our star. The two of us pulled that picture through somehow. I told her once that it was remarkable how much she knew about making a picture, and she reminded me that, after all, she had once been married to Fritz Lang." (It was actually Anatole Litvak.)

While in Europe, Meyer made Europe in the Raw immediately afterwards.

See also
List of American films of 1964

References

External links

1964 films
1960s sex comedy films
1960s historical comedy films
American black-and-white films
American sex comedy films
American historical comedy films
1960s English-language films
English-language German films
Films based on British novels
Films directed by Russ Meyer
Films set in London
Films set in the 18th century
1960s German-language films
German sex comedy films
West German films
Gloria Film films
German historical comedy films
1964 comedy films
Films shot at Spandau Studios
1960s American films
1960s German films